Lipoprotein(a) is a low-density lipoprotein variant containing a protein called apolipoprotein(a). Genetic and epidemiological studies have identified lipoprotein(a) as a risk factor for atherosclerosis and related diseases, such as coronary heart disease and stroke.

Lipoprotein(a) was discovered in 1963 by Kåre Berg. The human gene encoding apolipoprotein(a) was successfully cloned in 1987.

Structure 
Lipoprotein(a) [Lp(a)] consists of an LDL-like particle and the specific apolipoprotein(a), which is bound covalently to the apoB contained in the outer shell of the particle. Lp(a) plasma concentrations are highly heritable and mainly controlled by the LPA gene located on chromosome 6q26-27. Apo(a) proteins vary in size due to a size polymorphism [KIV-2 VNTR], which is caused by a variable number of kringle IV repeats in the LPA gene. This size variation at the gene level is expressed on the protein level as well, resulting in apo(a) proteins with 10 to more than 50 kringle IV repeats (each of the variable kringle IV consists of 114 amino acids). These variable apo(a) sizes are known as "apo(a) isoforms".

There is a general inverse correlation between the size of the apo(a) isoform and the Lp(a) plasma concentration. One theory explaining this correlation involves different rates of protein synthesis. Specifically, the larger the isoform, the more apo(a) precursor protein accumulates intracellularly in the endoplasmic reticulum. Lp(a) is not fully synthesised until the precursor protein is released from the cell, so the slower rate of production for the larger isoforms limits the plasma concentration.

Populations

Lp(a) concentrations can vary by more than one thousand between individuals, from <0.2 to >200 mg/dL. This range of concentrations is observed in all populations studied by scientists so far. The mean and median concentrations differ among world populations. Most prominently, there is a two- to threefold higher mean Lp(a) plasma concentration in populations of African descent compared to Asian, Oceanic, or European populations. The general inverse correlation between apo(a) isoform size and Lp(a) plasma concentration is observed in all populations. However, it was also discovered that mean Lp(a) associated with certain apo(a) isoforms varies between populations.

In addition to size effects, mutations in the LPA promoter may also lead to a decreased apo(a) production.

Function and pathology 
Lp(a) is assembled at the hepatocyte cell membrane surface, which is similar to typical LDL particles. However, there are other possible locations of assembly. The particles mainly exist in plasma.

Lp(a) contributes to the process of atherogenesis. The structure of apolipoprotein(a) is similar to plasminogen and tPA (tissue plasminogen activator) and it competes with plasminogen for its binding site, leading to reduced fibrinolysis. Also, because Lp(a) stimulates secretion of PAI-1, it leads to thrombogenesis. It also may enhance coagulation by inhibiting the function of tissue factor pathway inhibitor.

Moreover, Lp(a) carries atherosclerosis-causing cholesterol and binds atherogenic pro-inflammatory oxidised phospholipids as a preferential carrier of oxidised phospholipids in human plasma, which attracts inflammatory cells to vessel walls and leads to smooth muscle cell proliferation. Moreover, Lp(a) also is hypothesised to be involved in wound healing and tissue repair by interacting with components of the vascular wall and extracellular matrix. Apo(a), a distinct feature of the Lp(a) particle, binds to immobilized fibronectin and endows Lp(a) with the serine-proteinase-type proteolytic activity.

Nonetheless, individuals without Lp(a) or with very low Lp(a) levels seem to be healthy. Thus, plasma Lp(a) is not vital, at least under normal environmental conditions. Since apo(a)/Lp(a) appeared rather recently in mammalian evolution – only old world monkeys and humans have been shown to harbour Lp(a) – its function might not be vital, but just evolutionarily advantageous under certain environmental conditions, e.g. in case of exposure to certain infectious diseases.

Another possibility, suggested by Linus Pauling, is that Lp(a) is a primate adaptation to L-gulonolactone oxidase (GULO) deficiency, found only in certain lines of mammals. GULO is required for converting glucose to ascorbic acid (vitamin C), which is needed to repair arteries; following the loss of GULO, those primates who adopted diets less abundant in vitamin C may have used Lp(a) as an ascorbic-acid surrogate to repair arterial walls.

Catabolism and clearance
The half-life of Lp(a) in circulation is approximately three to four days. The mechanism and sites of Lp(a) catabolism are largely unknown. Uptake via the LDL receptor is not a major pathway of Lp(a) metabolism. The kidney has been identified as playing a role in Lp(a) clearance from plasma.

Disease
High Lp(a) in blood correlates with coronary heart disease (CHD), cardiovascular disease (CVD), atherosclerosis, thrombosis, and stroke. However, the association between Lp(a) levels and stroke is not as strong as that between Lp(a) and cardiovascular disease. Lp(a) concentrations may be affected by disease states (for example kidney failure), but are only slightly affected by diet, exercise, and other environmental factors.

Most commonly prescribed lipid-reducing drugs have little or no effect on Lp(a) concentration. Results using statin medications have been mixed in most trials, although a meta-analysis published in 2012 suggests that atorvastatin may be of benefit.

Niacin (Vitamin B3) has been shown to reduce the levels of Lp(a) in individuals with high levels of low-molecular weight Lp(a).

High Lp(a) correlates with early atherosclerosis independently of other cardiac risk factors, including LDL. In patients with advanced cardiovascular disease, Lp(a) indicates a coagulant risk of plaque thrombosis. Apo(a) contains domains that are very similar to plasminogen (PLG). Lp(a) accumulates in the vessel wall and inhibits the binding of PLG to the cell surface, reducing plasmin generation, which increases clotting. This inhibition of PLG by Lp(a) also promotes the proliferation of smooth muscle cells. These unique features of Lp(a) suggest that Lp(a) causes generation of clots and atherosclerosis.

In one homogeneous tribal population of Tanzania, vegetarians have higher levels of Lp(a) than fish eaters, raising the possibility that pharmacologic amounts of fish oil supplements may help lower the levels of Lp(a). Some studies have shown that regular consumption of moderate amounts of alcohol leads to a significant decline in plasma levels of Lp(a), while other studies have not.

Diagnostic testing
Numerous studies confirming a strong correlation between elevated Lp(a) and heart disease have led to the consensus that Lp(a) is an important independent predictor of cardiovascular disease. Animal studies have shown that Lp(a) may directly contribute to atherosclerotic damage by increasing plaque size, inflammation, instability, and smooth muscle cell growth. Genetic data also support the theory that Lp(a) causes cardiovascular disease.

The European Atherosclerosis Society currently recommends that patients with a moderate or high risk of cardiovascular disease should have their Lp(a) levels checked. Any patient with one of the following risk factors should be screened:
 premature cardiovascular disease
 familial hypercholesterolaemia
 family history of premature cardiovascular disease
 family history of elevated Lp(a)
 recurrent cardiovascular disease despite statin treatment
 ≥3% ten-year risk of fatal cardiovascular disease according to the European guidelines
 ≥10% ten-year risk of fatal and/or non-fatal cardiovascular disease according to the U.S. guidelines

If the level is elevated, treatment should be initiated to bring the level below 50 mg/dL. In addition, the patient's other cardiovascular risk factors (including LDL levels) should be managed optimally. Apart from the total Lp(a) plasma concentration, the apo(a) isoform might be an important risk parameter as well.

Prior studies of the relationship between Lp(a) and ethnicity have shown inconsistent results. Lp(a) levels seem to differ in different populations. For example, in some African populations, Lp(a) levels are higher on average than in other groups, so that using a risk threshold of 30 mg/dl could classify over 50% of the individuals as higher risk. Some part of this complexity may be related to the different genetic factors involved in determining Lp(a) levels.  One recent study showed that in different ethnic groups, different genetic alterations were associated with increased Lp(a) levels.

More recent data suggest that prior studies were underpowered. The Atherosclerosis Risk in Communities (ARIC) Study followed 3467 African Americans and 9851 whites for 20 years. The researchers found that an elevated Lp(a) conferred the same risk in each group. African Americans had roughly three times the level of Lp(a), however, and Lp(a) also predicted an increased risk of stroke.

Approximate levels of risk are indicated by the results below, although at present there are a variety of different methods by which to measure Lp(a). A standardized international reference material has been developed and is accepted by the WHO Expert Committee on Biological Standardization and the International Federation of Clinical Chemistry and Laboratory Medicine. Although further standardization is still needed, development of a reference material is an importance step toward standardizing results.

Lipoprotein(a) - Lp(a)
 Desirable:        <14 mg/dL      (<35 nmol/L)
 Borderline risk: 14–30 mg/dL    (35–75 nmol/L)
 High risk:         31–50 mg/dL  (75–125 nmol/L)
 Very high risk:  >50 mg/dL       (>125 nmol/L)

Lp(a) appears with different isoforms (per kringle repeats) of apolipoprotein; 40% of the variation in Lp(a) levels when measured in mg/dl can be attributed to different isoforms. Lighter Lp(a) are also associated with disease. Thus, a test with simple quantitative results may not provide a complete assessment of risk.

Treatment
The current simplest treatment for elevated Lp(a) is to take 1–3 grams of niacin daily, typically in an extended-release form. Niacin therapy may reduce Lp(a) levels by 20–30%. Aspirin may be beneficial, but it has only been tested in patients who carry the apolipoprotein(a) gene minor allele variant, (rs3798220). A meta-analysis suggested that atorvastatin also may lower Lp(a) levels. In severe cases, such as familial hypercholesterolemia or treatment-resistant hypercholesterolemia, lipid apheresis may dramatically reduce Lp(a). The goal of the treatment is to reduce levels to below 50 mg/dL.

Other medications that are in various stages of development include thyromimetics, cholesterol-ester-transfer protein (CETP inhibitors), anti-sense oligonucleopeptides, and proprotein convertase subtilisin/kexin type 9 (PCSK-9) inhibitors. L-carnitine may also reduce Lp(a) levels.

A meta-analysis of six clinical trials confirmed that flaxseed supplementation modestly lowers Lp(a) levels.

Gingko biloba may be a beneficial treatment, but clinical verification does not exist. Coenzyme Q-10 and pine bark extract have been suggested as beneficial, but neither has been proven in clinical trials.

Testosterone is known to reduce Lp(a) levels. Testosterone replacement therapy also appears to be associated with lower Lp(a) levels. One large study suggested that there was a decreased association between Lp(a) levels and risk. Estrogen as a prevention strategy for heart disease is a current topic of much research and debate. Risks and benefits may need to be considered for each individual. At present, estrogen is not indicated for treatment of elevated Lp(a). Raloxifene has not been shown to reduce Lp(a), while tamoxifen has.

The American Academy of Pediatrics now recommends that all children between the ages of nine and eleven years old be screened for hyperlipidemia. Lp(a) levels should be considered in particular in children with a family history of early heart disease or high blood cholesterol levels. Unfortunately, there have not been enough studies to determine which therapies might be beneficial.

Interactions 
Lp(a) has been shown to interact with calnexin, fibronectin, and fibrinogen beta chain.

See also 
 Lipoprotein
 Apolipoprotein
 Very-low-density lipoprotein
 Combined hyperlipidemia

References

External links 
 
 

Apolipoproteins
Lipid disorders
Cardiology